"Bye Bye Blues" is an American popular and jazz standard written by Fred Hamm, Dave Bennett, Bert Lown, and Chauncey Gray and published in 1925.

Background
The year it was introduced it was sung by The Vikings on the NBC radio series, The Vikings.

It has been recorded by many artists, but the best-known recording is one made in 1952 by Les Paul and Mary Ford. That recording was first released on the album "Bye Bye Blues" Capitol Records EBF-356, which reached the Billboard magazine Best Selling Popular Albums chart December 13, 1952. The single was released as catalog number 2316 backed with the Les Paul instrumental composition "Mammy's Boogie". It first reached the Billboard Best Seller chart on December 27, 1952 and lasted 5 weeks on the chart, peaking at #5.

Movie appearances
The song appeared as the title track of the 1989 film Bye Bye Blues. The song also appeared in the 1957 film The Joker is Wild and the 2005 film The Prize Winner of Defiance, Ohio.

Recorded versions

Ambrose (bandleader) and his orchestra (1930)
Bert Lown (1930)
Nat Gonella and His Georgians (1936)
Cab Calloway and his orchestra (1941)
Oscar Alemán (1942)
Arnold Ross Quintet featuring Benny Carter (1946)
Peggy Lee (recorded December 26, 1947)
Benny Goodman and his orchestra (1948)
Mary Lou Williams (1949)
Dinah Washington (1953)
Cal Tjader on his album 'Latin Kick' (1956)
Mose Allison (1958)
Ferrante and Teicher (1958)
Jill Corey (1957)
Freddy Cannon (1960)
Ann-Margret (1961)
Duane Eddy (1967)
Rob McConnell and the Boss Brass on Atras Da Porta (1983)
The Chenille Sisters (1992)
Doc Watson for his 1996 album Doc Watson in Nashville: Good Deal!
Count Basie and his orchestra
Tex Beneke and his orchestra
Chas and Dave
Mark Cosgrove
Bing Crosby and Louis Armstrong for their 1960 album Bing & Satchmo.
Fred Hamm and His Orchestra (May 1, 1925 Victor 19662-B <Discography of American Historical Recordings (DAHR)>
Al Hirt
Harry James and his orchestra
Rebecca Jenkins in the movie of the same name (1989)
Bert Kaempfert (1966 Top 100 single, peaking at #54, and #5 Easy Listening)
The Spotnicks (1964)
Kay Kyser and his orchestra
Brenda Lee (1966)
Liberace
Julie London (1957)
Bert Lown and his orchestra (1930)
Helen O'Connell
Oscar Peterson
Leo Reisman and his orchestra (vocal: Don Howard) (1930)
Jimmy Roselli (1981)
Dinah Shore (1949) (1960)
Hank Snow
Nino Tempo and April Stevens (1968)
Merle Travis
Frankie Trumbauer and his orchestra (vocal: Scrappy Lambert) (1930)
Andy Williams in (1966) as the B-side to the single, "May Each Day"
Teddy Wilson
Doyle Dykes on "Chameleon"
Henri Salvador in "avec la bouche"
Juan García Esquivel on "Infinity In Sound Vol. 2" (1961)
James Last (1966)

References

Songs about blues
1925 songs
1953 singles
1966 singles
Songs written by Fred Hamm
Songs written by Bert Lown
Les Paul songs
Mary Ford songs
Cab Calloway songs
Bing Crosby songs
Duane Eddy songs
Benny Goodman songs
Al Hirt songs
Brenda Lee songs
Peggy Lee songs
Dinah Shore songs
Hank Snow songs
Merle Travis songs
Dinah Washington songs
Andy Williams songs
Capitol Records singles